Daniel Garrigue (born 4 April 1948 in Talence) was a member of the National Assembly of France.  He represented Dordogne's 2nd constituency from 2002 to 2012 as a member of the Union for a Popular Movement. He was the sole member of the Assembly to vote against the French ban on full length Islamic veils stating that, "To fight an extremist behavior, we risk slipping toward a totalitarian society."

In 1974, was a founding member of the Club de l'horloge.

References

1948 births
Carrefour de l'horloge people
Living people
People from Talence
Rally for the Republic politicians
Union for a Popular Movement politicians
United Republic politicians
Deputies of the 12th National Assembly of the French Fifth Republic
Deputies of the 13th National Assembly of the French Fifth Republic